Leopold William Brandenburg (born 1886) was a 20th-century American medical doctor and criminal. He became notorious after surgically changing the fingerprints and "facial contour" of criminal Ronald Philipps, a.k.a. "Roscoe Pitts," in 1941, for which he was sentenced to three years in prison, although the sentence was later overturned. Pitts had attempted to rob a grocery store using explosives in Wilkesboro, North Carolina.

Brandenburg was later sentenced to five years in prison for illicitly prescribing morphine, a narcotic, to patients.

References

1886 births
American surgeons
Medical crime
Year of death missing